In mathematics, the Hermite constant, named after Charles Hermite, determines how long a shortest element of a lattice in Euclidean space can be.

The constant γn for integers n > 0 is defined as follows.  For a lattice L in Euclidean space Rn with unit covolume, i.e. vol(Rn/L) = 1, let λ1(L) denote the least length of a nonzero element of L.  Then  is the maximum of λ1(L) over all such lattices L.

The square root in the definition of the Hermite constant is a matter of historical convention.

Alternatively, the Hermite constant γn can be defined as the square of the maximal systole of a flat n-dimensional torus of unit volume.

Example
The Hermite constant is known in dimensions 1–8 and 24. 

For n = 2, one has γ2 = .  This value is attained by the hexagonal lattice of the Eisenstein integers.

Estimates
It is known that

A stronger estimate due to Hans Frederick Blichfeldt is

where  is the gamma function.

See also
Loewner's torus inequality

References

 
 
 

Systolic geometry
Geometry of numbers
Mathematical constants